Dejan Sarac (born 17 January 1998) is an Austrian footballer who plays as a midfielder or attacker for Kapfenberger SV.

Career

In 2015, Sarac joined the youth academy of Italian Serie A side Lazio, despite interest from Liverpool, one of the most successful clubs in England.

In 2018, he left Lazio due to injury.

Before the second half of 2018/19, Sarac signed for Austrian second division side Lafnitz, where he made 1 league appearance and scored 0 goals.

Before the second half of 2019/20, he signed for Varaždin in Croatia.

References

External links
 
 

Austrian expatriate footballers
Austrian footballers
Living people
1998 births
Austrian people of Croatian descent
Footballers from Graz
Association football midfielders
Association football forwards
SK Sturm Graz players
FC Admira Wacker Mödling players
S.S. Lazio players
SV Lafnitz players
NK Varaždin players
Kapfenberger SV players
2. Liga (Austria) players
Expatriate footballers in Italy
Expatriate footballers in Croatia
Austrian expatriate sportspeople in Italy
Austrian expatriate sportspeople in Croatia